The Independence Day is the national day of Moldova commemorating the adoption of the Declaration of Independence from the Soviet Union on 27 August 1991.

Background

The Supreme Soviet of Moldova held independent elections between February and June 1990. The elections resulted in Mircea Snegur being elected as speaker of the parliament (the effective head of state), with Mircea Druc as prime minister. On 23 June 1990, the parliament adopted the Declaration of Sovereignty of the Moldovan Soviet Socialist Republic, which, mainly stipulated the supremacy of Moldovan laws over those of the Soviet Union.

On 27 August 1991, the Parliament of the Republic of Moldova voted to adopt the Moldovan Declaration of Independence from the Soviet Union. That same day, the Popular Front of Moldova (FPM) organized a mass demonstration in Chișinău, that later became known as the Great National Assembly, which pressured Soviet authorities to adopt a language law on 31 August 1989, which proclaimed the Romanian language to be the state language of the Moldavian Soviet Socialist Republic. On 21 December 1991, Moldova, along with 10 other Soviet republics, signed the act that formed the Commonwealth of Independent States (CIS).

Holiday celebrations
Being a public holiday it is a free day for most of the people and employees, and in common with some other holidays, most companies do not open on 27 August each year. On this day, the President of the Republic gives a public speech, and officials lay flowers at the Stephen the Great Monument. A concert is also organized at the Great National Assembly Square. In 2001, 2011, 2016 and 2021, military parades have been held in the center of Chișinău, commemorating significant anniversaries of independence.

In 2020, due to the COVID-19 pandemic in Moldova, a national ceremony closed to the public was held in the Historical Hall of the Presidential Palace. That same year, in honor of the 29th anniversary of independence, a Turkish delegation, led by Foreign Minister Mevlüt Çavuşoğlu, inaugurated the consulate general of Turkey in Gagauzia, the first consulate opened in the region. He was accompanied by his Moldovan counterpart Oleg Țulea and Gagauzia Governor Irina Vlah.

See also
 Independence of Moldova 
 National Day 
 Chișinău Independence Day Parade
 Parliament of the Republic of Moldova

Notes

References

External links
 Declaration of Independence of the Republic of Moldova

1991 establishments in Moldova
Public holidays in Moldova
August observances
Moldova
1991 in Moldova
1991 in the Soviet Union
Popular Front of Moldova
Moldavian Soviet Socialist Republic
Moldova
Summer events in Moldova